Do Kuhak (also Romanized as Do Kūhak, Dow Kūhak, and Dūkūhak; also known as Dūdehak) is a village in Derak Rural District, in the Central District of Shiraz County, Fars Province, Iran. At the 2006 census, its population was 4,453, in 1,115 families.

References 

Populated places in Shiraz County